is a Japanese women's professional shogi player ranked 1-kyū.

Early life and becoming a women's professional shogi player
Matsushita was born in Kumamoto, Japan on October 25, 2006. She became interested in shogi when she was five years old after finding a shogi set as part of  board game collection.  Under the guidance of shogi professional Shūji Satō, she entered the Kyushu Branch of the Japan Shogi Association's training group system in 2020. In July 2022 while in her first year as a student at Kumamoto Prefectural Seiseikou High School, she qualified for women's professional status after being promoted to training group B2. She is the first women's professional shogi player to come from Kumamoto Prefecture.

Promotion history
Matsushita's promotion history is as follows.

 2-kyū: August 1, 2022
 1-kyū: October 19, 2022

Note: All ranks are women's professional ranks.

References

External links
 ShogiHub: Matsumoto, Marin

2006 births
Living people
Japanese shogi players
Women's professional shogi players
Professional shogi players from Kumamoto